Comănești Coal Mine is an underground mine exploitation, one of the largest in Romania located in Comănești, Bacău County with estimated coal reserves of 8.4 million tonnes. The legal entity managing the Comănești mine is the Ploieşti National Coal Company which was set up in 1957.

References

Coal mines in Romania